Maurel & Prom is an oil company specialising in the production of hydrocarbons. It is listed on Euronext Paris and has its registered office in Paris.

The Group generates most of its business in Africa through the exploitation of onshore production assets (in Gabon and Tanzania) and a significant stake in SEPLAT, one of Nigeria’s leading indigenous operators.

Since 16 February 2017 Maurel & Prom has been backed by PIEP, a subsidiary of oil company Pertamina, and aims to become the international development platform for the upstream activities of Pertamina and PIEP.

Historically, Maurel & Prom was based in Bordeaux and was one of France's largest family-run shipping and foreign trade houses. It had trading interests throughout the French colonial empire, which included trading houses in Saint-Louis, Senegal, and modern Guinea, Gambia, Mali and Ivory Coast. The company changed its focus to agribusiness in 1986. It pivoted to oil exploration and production in 1998.

Assets Portfolio 

- France (Headquarters) 

- Italia: Exploration & Appraisal 

- Colombia: Exploration & Appraisal 

- Venezuela: Production 

- Nigeria (20.46% stake in Seplat): Production

- Gabon : Exploration & Production

- Angola : Production

- Nambia: Exploration & Appraisal 

- Tanzania: Production, Exploration & Appraisal

Shareholding
On December 31,2021:

PIEP: 71.09%

Individual investors: 18.57%

Institutional investors: 6.08%

Treasury shares: 1.81%

Employees: 0.76%

Others: 1.68%

Notes

References - Contemporary company
Etablissements Maurel et Prom S.A. website.
dailyestimate.com Gabon: Energy profile, Tuesday, November 6, 2007.
“Membres du conseil et fonctions”

References - History
Andrew, C.M. & Kanya-Forstner,  A.S.; "French Business and the French Colonialists." The Historical Journal, Vol. 19, No. 4 (Dec., 1976), pp. 981–1000
Barrows, Leland C.; General Faidherbe, the Maurel and Prom Company, and French Expansion in Senegal. Dissertation Abstracts International 35 8 (1975).
Barrows. Leland C.; "Faidherbe and Senegal: A Critical Discussion". African Studies Review, Vol. 19, No. 1 (Apr., 1976), pp. 95–117.
Gellar, Sheldon; Structural Changes and Colonial Dependency: Senegal, 1885-1945. Sage: London (1976).
Hopkins, A.G.; "Imperial Business in Africa. Part I: Sources." The Journal of African History, Vol. 17, No. 1 (1976), pp. 29–48
McLane, Margaret O.; "Commercial Rivalries and French Policy on the Senegal River, 1831-1858." African Economic History, No. 15 (1986), pp. 39–67.
Marfaing, Laurence; L'Evolution du commerce au Senegal, 1820-1930. Paris (1992)
Newbury, C.W.; "The Protectionist Revival in French Colonial Trade: The Case of Senegal." The Economic History Review, New Series, Vol. 21, No. 2 (Aug., 1968), pp. 337–348.
Niaré, Djibril Issa; CONTRIBUTION À L'HISTOIRE ÉCONOMIQUE DU SOUDAN FRANÇAIS :LE COMMERCE COLONIAL :1870-1960. Université de Bamako Faculté des Lettres, Langues, Arts et Sciences Humaines (2007)
Péhaut, Yves; "Les maisons de négoce bordelaises face aux mutations du négoce dans les années 1920-1960 (Maurel et Prom)", in BONIN Hubert, CAHEN Michel (eds), Négoce blanc en Afrique noire. L'évolution du commerce à longue distance en Afrique noire du 18e au 20e siècles. Paris, Société française d'histoire d'outre-mer - Alterna, 2001.
Péhaut, Yves; Le réseau d’influence bordelais : la "doyenne" Maurel & Prom jusqu’en 1914 (doc) or Le réseau d’influence bordelais : la "doyenne" Maurel & Prom jusqu’en 1914 (pdf).

Transport companies established in 1831
French West Africa
Oil companies of France
Shipping companies of France
French brands
French companies established in 1831
Companies listed on Euronext Paris